Hashisheen: The End of Law is an album by American composer Bill Laswell. It was released on May 25, 1999 by Sub Rosa.

Track listing

Personnel 
Adapted from the Hashisheen: The End of Law liner notes.

Spoken word artists
Hakim Bey – spoken word (5, 6, 21)
Nicole Blackman – spoken word (7, 9, 11, 19)
William S. Burroughs – spoken word (3)
Anne Clark – spoken word (20)
Ira Cohen – spoken word (10)
Lizzy Mercier Descloux – spoken word (14)
Sussan Deyhim – spoken word (1, 4, 22)
Umar Bin Hassan – spoken word (18)
Percy Howard – spoken word (2, 8, 12)
Genesis P-Orridge – spoken word (2, 16, 17, 20)
Iggy Pop – spoken word (3, 15)
Patti Smith – spoken word (14)
Jah Wobble – bass guitar, keyboards and spoken word (13)

Musicians
Helios Creed – guitar and effects (16, 17)
Anton Fier – drums (7, 8, 11, 19)
Bill Laswell – bass guitar and effects (16, 17), musical arrangements
Jaki Liebezeit – drums (13)
Neville Murray – bendir and congas (13)
Oliver Ray – guitar (14)
Paul Schütze – instruments (12, 15)
Nicky Skopelitis – guitar (5, 14)
Techno Animal – instruments (3)
Technical
Peter Becker – producer, engineering
Mark Ferda – engineering, mixing
Janet Rienstra – producer, musical arrangements
Hugo Scholten – engineering

Release history

References

External links 
 
 The End of Law at Bandcamp

1999 albums
Bill Laswell albums
Sub Rosa Records albums